Elvira Navarro Ponferrada (born 25 March 1978) is a Spanish writer.

Career
Elvira Navarro holds a licentiate in Philosophy from the Complutense University of Madrid. In 2004 she won the City Council of Madrid's Young Creators Competition, and enjoyed a creative scholarship at the Residencia de Estudiantes. She has published two complementary books: La ciudad en invierno (The City in Winter) and La ciudad feliz (The Happy City), as well as the novels La trabajadora (The Working Woman) and Los últimos días de Adelaida García Morales (The Last Days of Adelaida García Morales). Navarro is also the author of the blog Periferia, an ongoing work on the neighborhoods of Madrid that explores bordering and undefined spaces. In 2010 she was included in the magazine Grantas list of the 22 best Spanish-language novelists under 35.

In 2013 she was selected as one of the Spanish voices with the greatest futures by El Cultural, and in 2014 the same magazine rated La trabajadora one of the ten best Spanish-language novels of the year. Portions of her work have been translated into English, French, Swedish, Italian, Turkish, and Arabic.

She has written for magazines such as El Cultural, Ínsula, Letras Libres, Turia, and Calle 20, and for the newspapers Público, eldiario.es, El Mundo, and El País. She has performed literary criticism for Qué Leer, Revista de Libros, and the blog . She became editor of the Caballo de Troya imprint in 2015, and teaches writing workshops.

Controversy
Her novel Los últimos días de Adelaida García Morales was harshly criticized by the filmmaker Víctor Erice in El País. Erice accused Navarro of trivializing the figure of Adelaida García Morales (his ex-wife), and causing grief to her loved ones by writing "a sort of fake fiction documentary" rather than a well-researched biography. Navarro's retort and various public interventions by other writers (such as Juan Marsé, in support of Erice) increased the controversy and the debate over the limits of fiction.

Works

Novels and short stories
 La ciudad en invierno, Barcelona, Caballo de Troya, 2007; Debolsillo, 2008; Debolsillo 2012; 
 La ciudad feliz, Barcelona, Mondadori, 2009, 
 El invierno y la ciudad, RHM Flash (ePub), 2012, 
 La trabajadora, Barcelona, Penguin Random House, 2014, 
 Los últimos días de Adelaida García Morales, Barcelona, Random House, 2016,

Collective works
 Quince golpes en la cabeza, compilation by Ernesto Pérez Castillo, Havana, Editorial Cajachina, 2008
 Elegías íntimas.
 Asamblea portátil. Muestrario de narradores iberoamericanos.
 Madrid / Barcelona. Literatura y ciudad (1995–2010), editing, introduction, and reading guide by Jorge Carrión, Madrid, Iberoamericana Editorial Vervuert and Cátedra Miguel Delibes (Valladolid), 2009
 The best of young Spanish language novelists, New York, Granta, 2010; Los mejores narradores jóvenes en español, Barcelona, Granta – Duomo, 2010
 Siglo XXI. Los nuevos narradores del cuento español actual, editing by Gemma Pellicer and Fernando Valls, Palencia, Menoscuarto Ediciones, 2010
 Chéjov comentado, editing by Sergi Bellver, Madrid, Nevsky Prospects, 2010
 Pequeñas Resistencias 5.  Antología del nuevo cuento español (2001–2010), editing by Andrés Neuman, Madrid, Editorial Páginas de Espuma, 2010
 Los oficios del libro, various authors, Madrid, Libros de la ballena, 2011
 Cuentos en blanco y negro, editing by Miguel Ángel Oeste, Ministry of Culture of the City of Melilla, Manigua, 2012
 Passageways, editing by Camille T. Dungy and Daniel Hahn, San Francisco, Two Lines – World Writing in Translation, 2012
 En breve. Cuentos de escritoras españolas (1975–2010). Estudio y antología, editing by Ángeles Encinar and Carmen Valcárcel, Madrid, Editorial Biblioteca Nueva, 2012
 Mar de pirañas. Nuevas voces del microrrelato español, editing by Fernando Valls, Palencia, Menoscuarto, 2012, 
 Madrid, con perdón. Editing and prologue by Mercedes Cebrián. Editorial Caballo de Troya, 2012
 Cuento español actual, compilation by Ángeles Encinar, Editorial Cátedra, 2013

Awards and distinctions
 2004: Young Creators Award from the City Council of Madrid
 2007: Fnac New Talent Distinction for La ciudad en invierno
 2008: Finalist for the Huelva Youth Awards
 2009: 25th  for La ciudad feliz
 2009: Evolución 09 El Duende/PlayStation Literary Creation Award
 2009: La ciudad feliz chosen by Públicos Culturas section as one of the year's eye-opening books
 2009: 4th  for Best New Author for La ciudad feliz
 2009: Finalist for the 7th Dulce Chacón Spanish Narrative Award for La ciudad feliz
 2014: La trabajadora chosen by El Mundos magazine El Cultural as one of the year's best Spanish-language books
 2017: Finalist for the 5th Premio de Narrativa Breve Ribera del Duero for La isla de los conejos

References

External links

 
 Periferia

1978 births
21st-century Spanish novelists
Complutense University of Madrid alumni
Living people
People from Huelva
Spanish literary critics
Spanish women literary critics
Spanish women novelists
Spanish women short story writers
Spanish short story writers